Monica Brodd (born 1973) is a Swedish model and beauty pageant titleholder who won the Miss Sweden in 1992, and was in top 10 at Miss Universe the same year.

References 

1973 births
Living people
Miss Universe 1992 contestants
Miss Sweden winners
Place of birth missing (living people)